Kaykhusraw, Kaykhosrow, Kay Khosrow, Kaikhosro, Kaikhosrow, Kai Khusraw, Kay Khusrau, or Kay Khusraw may refer to one of the following persons, named after the legendary Persian warrior Kai Khosrow:

 Kaykhusraw I (died 1211), Seljuq Sultan of Rum
 Kaykhusraw II (died 1246), Seljuq Sultan of Rum
 Kaykhusraw III (died 1284), Seljuq Sultan of Rum
 Kay Khusraw ibn Yazdagird (died 1328), Bavandid king in Mazandaran
 Amir Ghiyas al-Din Kai-Khusrau (died 1338/9), Injuid ruler
 Kaikhosro II Jaqeli (died 1573), atabeg of the Principality of Samtskhe 
 Kaikhosro, Prince of Mukhrani (died 1629), prince of the House of Mukhrani
 Kaikhosro I Gurieli (died 1660), member of the House of Gurieli
 Kaikhosro II Gurieli (died 1689), member of the House of Gurieli
 Kaikhosro III Gurieli (died c. 1751), member of the House of Gurieli
 Kaikhosro IV Gurieli (died 1829), member of the House of Gurieli
 Kaikhosro of Kartli (died 1711), Safavid commander-in-chief, Safavid-appointed vali/king of Kartli
 Kaykhosrow Khan (tofangchi-aghasi) (died 1674), commander of the Safavid Empire's musketeer corps
 Kaikhosru Shapurji Sorabji (died 1988), English composer, music critic, and pianist